The 2012–13 Mid-American Conference men's basketball season is the 67th college basketball season in the conference's existence.  The conference features 12 teams in two divisions, East and West, who competed for the Mid-American Conference (MAC) regular season and tournament titles.  Akron and Ohio shared the regular season title with 14-2 records in conference play.  Akron won both games with Ohio but lost two late season games.  Akron was the top-seed in the tournament and defeated Ohio in the final.  D. J. Cooper of Ohio was voted as the MAC player of the year.

Pre-season

Media voting 
On October 29, the members of the MAC News Media Panel voted in the Preseason Media Poll.  They voted Ohio as the favorite in the MAC East Division and Toledo in the MAC West Division.

The media also took a vote on who they think would win the MAC tournament at the end of the season.  Unlike the preseason votes, the media would only select the winner of the tournament, and not the placement of the teams afterwards.  Ohio received the most votes with 18, followed by Akron with six votes.

Exhibition schedule

*All Times Eastern

Regular season

Preconference schedules

Conference schedules
This table summarizes the head-to-head results between teams in conference play. Teams play opponents in their division twice, once at home and once away. Teams play opponents outside of their division once a season. (x) indicates games remaining this season.

BracketBusters

*All Times Eastern

Post-season tournaments

MAC Tournament 

The 2013 MAC tournament only had 11 teams due to Toledo being ineligible for post season play due to low APR Scores. The Semifinals and Championship Game were held at Quicken Loans Arena.

NCAA Tournament

National Invitation Tournament

College Basketball Invitational

CollegeInsider.com Postseason Tournament

Awards

All-MAC Preseason Team 
As a part of the Preseason Media Poll, the members also voted on the Preseason All-MAC East and West Division teams.  Ohio and Toledo had two players in the East and West Division polls, respectively.

Player of the Week

All-MAC Teams

See also
 2012–13 Mid-American Conference women's basketball season

References